Emilio De Marchi (1851–1901) was an Italian novelist, known for his portrayals of Milan and Lombardy in the nineteenth century. Several of his works have been adapted for film and television including two 1940s films Giacomo the Idealist and The Priest's Hat.
 
De Marchi became widely celebrated as a master of literary translation. Among others he translated into Italian all the fables of Jean de La Fontaine.

References

Bibliography
 Goble, Alan. The Complete Index to Literary Sources in Film. Walter de Gruyter, 1999.

External links

1851 births
1901 deaths
Italian novelists
Writers from Milan